Simon Lovell (born 1957) is an English comedy magician, actor, and card sharp, who specialises in magic using playing cards.

Career
Lovell was a regular performer in Monday Night Magic, an off-Broadway show featuring magicians and related performers. He also appeared in the one-man off-Broadway show Strange and Unusual Hobbies, which combined humor with card and magic tricks, and ran for eight years at the SoHo Playhouse.

He was a consultant con man for Matt Bomer in the show White Collar.

In 1987, Lovell appeared performing a magic trick in series one of ChuckleVision. Other TV appearances include VH1 reality show Celebracadabra, on which he and other magicians trained celebrities to perform magic tricks.

Lovell has written 16 books, including How to Cheat at Everything: A Con Man Reveals the Secrets of the Esoteric Trade of Cheating, Scams, and Hustles (first published as Billion Dollar Bunko).

Books

References

 The Linking Ring Volume 84 Number 11 (November 2004)

English magicians
Comedians from Manchester
1957 births
Living people